Keswick railway station was on the Cockermouth, Keswick and Penrith Railway between Penrith and Cockermouth in Cumberland (now in Cumbria), England. It served the town of Keswick and accommodated the offices of the Cockermouth, Keswick and Penrith Railway Company.

The station has its origins in 1861, when the construction of a railway line between Cockermouth and the West Coast Main Line of the London and North Western Railway (LNWR) company at Penrith was authorised. In 1862, the company decided to establish its office at the station. The site had an engine shed, a carriage shed capable of accommodating at least six carriages and a turntable. The station was designed by the railway engineer Thomas Bouch; construction was by contractor George Bolton & Sons. On 2 January 1865, the station was opened to passenger traffic.

As a result of the Beeching cuts, the line beyond Keswick to Cockermouth and Workington was closed on 18 April 1966, leaving a single line branch between Keswick and Penrith. The station survived for six years before closing on 6 March 1972. The main station building has been used as a hotel in recent years but most of the other structures have been demolished and the land used for car parking. A trail managed by the Lake District National Park Authority has been established along part of the former railway line.

History

Background
On 1 August 1861, the Cockermouth, Keswick and Penrith Railway Company was incorporated in accordance with an Act of Parliament authorising the construction of a railway between Cockermouth and the London and North Western Railway's West Coast Main Line at Penrith. The line's civil engineering works were designed by Thomas Bouch, including Keswick station.

In 1862, the company's stations committee decided that the station should accommodate its main offices. The station was built on land purchased from Roger Eustace Le Fleming, about 0.5 km to the north of Keswick town centre. The station, around midway along the line, was built on an east–west alignment.

Following competitive bidding, the company accepted contractor George Bolton & Son's tender of £3,500 to build the station. In November 1863, the works committee approved the construction of additional facilities including an engine shed, a carriage shed capable of accommodating at least six carriages and a turntable. A portico was added to the station design before work commenced.

Design and operations
The station was built with two platforms, the up platform to accommodate eastbound services and the down platform for westbound trains. A two-storey building of local stone, was constructed on the down platform; its upper storey housed the company's boardroom and offices for the company secretary, train coordinator and accountant, while the lower storey was occupied by the ticket office, luggage and parcels office, lavatories and waiting rooms. The waiting rooms opened onto the platform, most of which was protected by a glazed roof on top of a cantilevered valance, supported on rows of iron columns. The eastbound up platform had a waiting shelter and a large rectangular water tank.

A goods station was established to the west of the station. In 1865, a refreshments room opened but by April 1875 the space it occupied was used as a first class waiting room and lavatory. In 1873, to provide better means of access between the platforms, a subway was built. A year later, a crane was installed at the east end of the up platform to ease freight loading/unloading.

Around 1870, W.H. Smith & Son opened a bookstall; it was open until 1905. Between 1909 and 1921, newsagents Wyman & Sons managed the bookstall. Local stationer A. Chaplin took over until around 1931. Wymans then managed bookstalls on both platforms until the 1950s.

In 1880, Cowans Sheldon & Company of Carlisle enlarged the water tank on the up platform. By 1893, the island platform was relocated to a more northerly position where a single-storey timber building with brick chimneys, a slate roof and cantilevered valances supported by iron columns was constructed.

Decline and closure

As a result of the Beeching cuts, the railway line beyond Keswick to Cockermouth and Workington was closed on 18 April 1966. Keswick was left at the end of a single line branch from Penrith. Six years later, British Rail closed the line and the station on 6 March 1972. After its closure, most of the structures, including the island platform and its building and water tank, were demolished. The land was  used as a car park for a nearby hotel. The building on the down platform, incorporating the offices of the Cockermouth, Keswick and Penrith Railway Company, has been integrated into the hotel. In 1976, the building was recognised as a Grade II listed building.

A railway trail, owned by the Lake District National Park Authority, has been established since the closure. It starts at the station site, crosses several bridges along a gentle climbing route of roughly 5 km and ends at the mining museum, east of Threlkeld car park.

A movement to reopen the station and the line to Penrith has conducted studies into its viability.

See also

Listed buildings in Keswick, Cumbria

References

Citations

Bibliography

 
 
 
 

Disused railway stations in Cumbria
Former Cockermouth, Keswick and Penrith Railway stations
Railway stations in Great Britain opened in 1865
Railway stations in Great Britain closed in 1972
Beeching closures in England
Keswick
Grade II listed buildings in Cumbria